This is a List of World Championships medalists in women's Freestyle Wrestling.

Light flyweight
 44 kg: 1987–1996

Flyweight
 47 kg: 1987–1996
 46 kg: 1997–2001
 48 kg: 2002–2017
 50 kg: 2018–

Bantamweight
 50 kg: 1987–1996
 51 kg: 1997–2013
 53 kg: 2014–

Featherweight
 53 kg: 1987–1996
 55 kg: 2014–

Lightweight
 57 kg: 1987–1996
 56 kg: 1997–2001
 55 kg: 2002–2013
 58 kg: 2004–2017
 57 kg: 2018–

Welterweight
 59 kg: 2002–2013
 60 kg: 2014–2017
 59 kg: 2018–

Middleweight
 61 kg: 1987–1996
 62 kg: 1997–2001
 63 kg: 2002–2017
 62 kg: 2018–

Super middleweight
 65 kg: 1987–

Light heavyweight
 70 kg: 1987–1996
 68 kg: 1997–2001
 67 kg: 2002–2013
 69 kg: 2014–2017
 68 kg: 2018–

First heavyweight
 72 kg: 2018–

Heavyweight
 75 kg: 1987–2001
 72 kg: 2002–2013
 75 kg: 2014–2017
 76 kg: 2018–

Medal table

 Names in italic are national entities that no longer exist.

References
UWW Database
info.2008.sohu.com

Medalists
Wrestling World Championships women
Lists of female wrestlers